A Decent Man (original title: Je ne suis pas un salaud) is a 2015 French drama film written and directed by Emmanuel Finkiel. It stars Nicolas Duvauchelle and Mélanie Thierry.

After a violent street attack, Eddie accuses Ahmed, whom he's seen on the street some days before. But is he guilty, and is Eddie wrong…?

Cast 
 Nicolas Duvauchelle as Eddie
 Mélanie Thierry as Karine
 Driss Ramdi as Ahmed
 Maryne Cayon as Estelle
 Johann Soulé as Noam
 Nicolas Bridet as Régis Labrecque

References

External links 
 

2015 films
2015 drama films
2010s French-language films
French drama films
Films directed by Emmanuel Finkiel
2010s French films